SHC SH2 domain-binding protein 1 is a protein that in humans is encoded by the SHCBP1 gene.

Interactions 

SHCBP1 has been shown to interact with SHC1.

References

Further reading